The Whirlpool is a 1918 American silent crime film directed by Alan Crosland and starring Alice Brady, Holmes Herbert and William B. Davidson.

Plot summary

Cast
 Alice Brady as Isabele Corbyn, aka Bella Cavello 
 Holmes Herbert as Judge Reverton 
 J.H. Gilmour as Ferris 
 William B. Davidson as Arthur Hallam 
 Robert Walker as Richard Brettner 
 Warren Cook as Colonel Warren 
 W.E. Williams as Dr. Comyns 
 Louise Lee as Mrs. Danzart 
 Virginia Lee as Miss Danzart 
 Mabel Guilford as Nurse 
 Wallace Clarke as Butler 
 H. Van Beusen as Detective 
 Joseph Burke as Guide

References

Bibliography
 Goble, Alan. The Complete Index to Literary Sources in Film. Walter de Gruyter, 1999.

External links
 
 
 
 

1918 films
1918 crime drama films
American crime drama films
Films directed by Alan Crosland
American silent feature films
American black-and-white films
Selznick Pictures films
1910s English-language films
1910s American films
Silent American drama films